Vendramini is an Italian surname.  It may refer to:

 Danny Vendramini, director of Redheads (1992 film)
 Elisabetta Vendramini (1790–1860), Italian nun
 Giovanni Vendramini (1769–1839), Italian engraver  
 Luigi Vendramini (born 1996), Brazilian mixed martial artist

See also 
 Vendramin family

Italian-language surnames